Caillard is a surname of French origin. Notable people with the surname include:

 Marc-Aurèle Caillard (born 1994), French footballer
 Philippe Caillard (born 1924), French choral conductor, professor of music etc.
 Stéphane Caillard (born 1988), French actress and comedienne
 Sir Vincent Caillard (financier) (1856–1930), British army officer, financier and alderman